Invictus, published in 2016, is the fifteenth volume of the Eagles of the Empire series by Simon Scarrow.

Cover description
AD 54. The soldiers of the Roman army patrol a vast Empire, enforcing imperial rule with brutal efficiency.

In Hispania, tensions have reached boiling point. Bands of rebels range over the land. A unit of the army's finest is dispatched to restore the peace. Their commander is Vitellius, a veteran of unmatched ambition.
 
Prefect Cato and Centurion Macro are amongst the Roman troops. Their mission is fraught with danger: on the one hand, feuding tribes, challenging terrain and an embittered populace. On the other: intrigue against the aging Emperor Claudius.

Only through strategic brilliance, unparalleled courage and the smile of good fortune can Macro and Cato hope to triumph - or even survive...

References

2016 British novels
Eagles of the Empire
Novels set in the 1st century
Headline Publishing Group books